The 2010 AIHL season was the 11th season of the Australian Ice Hockey League (AIHL). It also marked the 10th Anniversary since the league’s inception in 2000. The league ran from 24 April 2010 until 22 August 2010, with the Goodall Cup finals following on 28 and 29 August 2010. The Newcastle North Stars won the H Newman Reid Trophy after finishing the regular season first in the league standings. Melbourne Ice won the Goodall Cup for the first time by defeating the defending champions Adelaide Adrenaline in the final.

Teams
In 2010 the AIHL had 7 teams competing in the league.

League business

During the off-season, the AIHL held its AGM where four board positions were filled following the retirement of three members. Chairman, Tim Frampton, was re-elected. The AGM agenda included the new stadium for Melbourne, scheduling, sponsorship, and referee management for the 2010 season.  Other topics included IHA relations and a proposed new team from Brisbane. The AIHL Bears renamed to the Sydney Bears. The team was previously known as the Sydney Bears between 1997 and 2007.

In January, the AIHL released the season schedule. Seven teams would compete in eighty-four matches between April and August. The opening round of the season would kick off on the Anzac Day Weekend.

In February, the new ice sports stadium in Melbourne was opened. Named the Icehouse, the new stadium boasts two Olympic-sized ice rinks and is the third rink in Australia to be fully glassed. The new facility is the home of the Olympic Winter Institute of Australia. In late February it was announced the Melbourne Ice would relocate to the new stadium in Docklands from the Olympic Ice Skating Centre, Oakleigh South.

In March, the AIHL announced a change to how the Finals host would be selected. Rather than a combined member and board vote, the hosting rights would be put up for open tender. The League also welcomed back the Goodall Cup after a one year absence. Ice Hockey Australia made the request for the league to take back the Cup and the organisation voted to restore the Goodall Cup as the Championship winning prize for the AIHL. The newly minted AIHL Champions Trophy was renamed and re-purposed by the AIHL to become the H Newman Reid Trophy and would be handed to the regular season premiers. 2009 AIHL Champions, the Adelaide Adrenaline, were etched into the Goodall Cup. 

During the season, the Gold Coast Blue Tongues signed an agreement with the Southern Stars Ice Hockey Club to play two home games in Brisbane at the olympic sized Acacia Ridge ice rink.  AIHL Vice President Joshua Puls tendered his resignation citing an over commitment with Victoria's disadvantaged communities and a perceived conflict of interest after accepting an appointment as Patron of the Melbourne Ice as his reasons for the decision. The Sydney Ice Dogs also announced the launch of Ice Dogs TV featuring highlights from 2010 Ice Dogs home games as well as player interviews and other content. In July, the league announced the new Melbourne Icehouse had been selected from the tender and would be the host venue for the 2010 Finals series.

Regular season

April

May

June

July

August

 I Double points game.

Standings

Source

Statistics

Scoring leaders
List shows the ten top skaters sorted by points, then goals.

Leading goaltenders
Only the top five goaltenders, based on save percentage.

Goodall Cup playoffs
The playoffs were held between 28 and 29 August with all three games being played at the Icehouse in Melbourne. Melbourne Ice won the final and the Goodall Cup (1st title) after defeating the then defending champions Adelaide Adrenaline 6–4. The Ice took an early lead in the final before going behind twice. A strong finish to the match saw the Goodall Cup return to Victoria for the first time in 27 years. Melbourne Ice's Canadian born forward, Jason Baclig, was named the finals most valuable player (MVP) and was awarded the inaugural Kendall Finals MVP trophy.

All times are UTC+10:00

Semi-finals

Final

References

External links
The Australian Ice Hockey League

AIHL season
AIHL
Australian Ice Hockey League seasons